Patriarch John IV may refer to:

 Patriarch John IV of Alexandria, Greek Patriarch of Alexandria in 569–579
 Patriarch John IV of Constantinople, ruled in 582–595
 Patriarch John IV of Antioch (designation contended among various people)
 John IV, Maronite Patriarch (designation contended among various people)